William Francis Kenrick Wynne-Jones, Baron Wynne-Jones (8 May 1903 – 8 November 1982) was a British chemist. Raised to the peerage in 1964, he sat as a Labour peer. Research Assistant and lecturer in Physical Chemistry, University of Bristol. International Research Fellow, University of Copenhagen (Denmark) (1927–29); Lecturer in Chemisrrv, University of Reading (1929–38); Leverhulme Research Fellow, Princeton University (USA I (1934); Professor of Chemistry, University College, Dundee (then a part of the University of St Andrews, but which later became the University of Dundee) (1938–47); Professor of Physical Chemistry. King's College, Newcastle upon Tyne (1947–56) and Professor of Chemistry and Head of the School of Chemistry, Newcastle University, 1956-68. Pro Vice-Chancellor, Newcastle University, 1965-68.

Wynne-Jones was created a Life Peer on 17 December 1964 with the title Baron Wynne-Jones, of Abergele in the County of Denbigh.

Lord Wynne-Jones died in 1982.

References 

1903 births
1982 deaths
British chemists
Academics of the University of Dundee
Academics of the University of St Andrews
Labour Party (UK) life peers
Life peers created by Elizabeth II